Malika Dhuri is a  high mountain peak in Muna, Myagdi, Nepal. The name is derived from two local words Malika (name of the place) and Dhuri (mountain peak).

It entirely lies in Dhaulagiri Rural Municipality - 3, Muna, Nepal. It touches the borderline of Baglung District. It touches the border line of Dhorpatan hunting reserve. Almost all the villages around the Myagdi River (also called Myagdi Khola in the local language) and few parts of Baglung District can be seen from this place. It is the peak place of Muna village and also of the Myagdi District. It is taller than other mountains in Myagdi District as well as in Baglung District. As it lies on the border of Myagdi and Baglung; it may also be known by the name of “joint view point of myagdi and baglung”.

At the peak, there is no forest. But on the lower portion there is a dense forest. From this forest two rivers come out. In this forest (in Malika Dhuri) there are many wild animals and birds such as Ghoral, Kasturi (musk deer), danphe, munnal etc. From the peak of this Malika Dhuri in the northern part, Dhaulagiri, Churen, Gurja hills and in the eastern part, Machapuchare hills can be seen. This peak is covered with snow in the winter season and temperature falls below zero degrees Celsius. In the summer season it seems green.

The old people of Muna village say that here used to hold a fair up to 2003 B.S.(1946 A.D.).

Mountains of the Gandaki Province
Myagdi District